Alula Pankhurst (born 1962) is an Ethiopian scholar and social development consultant whose main focus is Ethiopia and Ethiopian studies. He has worked in Ethiopia for many years in a variety of positions including as an associate professor of anthropology at Addis Ababa University and as the country director for Young Lives.

Career
Pankhurst is a graduate of Oxford University and has an MA (1986) and PhD (1989) in Social Anthropology from the Manchester University. He has strong links with Ethiopia; his grandmother Sylvia Pankhurst was a champion of Ethiopia during World War II and his father Richard Pankhurst lived and worked in Ethiopia for decades. Pankhurst's first name is in honor of Ras Alula, a famous Ethiopian leader. Pankhurst has led a variety of studies and projects on behalf of various groups such as the World Bank, IrishAid, Organization for Social Science Research in Eastern and Southern Africa, and International Livestock Centre for Africa.

Publications
Pankhurst has published a number of academic and professional books and articles. Topics have included traditional peacemaking and reconciliation, issues of internal migration and resettlement, poverty, AIDS, funeral associations, and access to natural resources. In Peripheral People, he stated that marginalized people in Ethiopia are sometimes considered "not real people". The fuga group was identified as one of these and members were not allowed to participate in social and political administration of their community.

Partial bibliography
Girke, Felix and Alula Pankhurst. 2011. Evoking Peace and Arguing Harmony: An Example of Transcultural Rhetoric in Southern Ethiopia, in C. Meyer and F. Girke eds. The Rhetorical Emergence of Culture. New York, Oxford: Berghahn Book.
Pankhurst, Alula. 1999. ‘Caste’ in Africa: the evidence from south-western Ethiopia reconsidered. Africa 69: 485–509.
Pankhurst, Alula. 2008. The emergence, evolution and transformations of iddir funeral associations in urban Ethiopia. Journal of Ethiopian Studies 41(1-2): 143–186.
Pankhurst, Alula. 2006. A peace ceremony in Arbore, pp. 247–68 in Ivo Strecker and Jean Lydal ed. The Perils of Face: Essays on cultural contact, respect and self-esteem in southern Ethiopia. Münster: Litt Verlag.
Pankhurst, Alula. 2004. Social exclusion and cultural marginalisation: minorities of craftworkers and hunters in Ethiopia in  A. Bohnet and M. Hoher eds. The Role of Minorities in the Development Process. Frankfurt: Peter Lang, pp. 85–128.
Pankhurst, Alula. 2003. Research on Ethiopian societies and cultures during the second half of the Twentieth Century. Journal of Ethiopian Studies 35: 1-60.

References

External links
Pankhurst's CV
 paper on AIDS responses from villages

Academic staff of Addis Ababa University
Living people
Social anthropologists
Alumni of the University of Manchester
English people of Ethiopian descent
Ethiopianists
English people of Italian descent
Alula
1962 births